Gaston Koëger (23 July 1887 – 25 November 1960) was a French athlete. He competed in the men's pole vault at the 1908 Summer Olympics.

References

1887 births
1960 deaths
Athletes (track and field) at the 1908 Summer Olympics
French male pole vaulters
Olympic athletes of France
Place of birth missing